Prof. Ram Shankar Shinde was a member of the 13th Maharashtra Legislative Assembly. He represented the Karjat Jamkhed Assembly Constituency. He belongs to the Bharatiya Janata Party. He was appointed Maharashtra's minister of state in December, 2014 and was given responsibility of the home portfolio as well as for Public Health, Agriculture, Horticulture, Marketing and Tourism. He was also made guardian minister of Ahmednagar district. On 8 July 2016 in cabinet expansion he was promoted to cabinet rank and given charge of Water conservation Ministry.

References

Maharashtra MLAs 2014–2019
People from Ahmednagar district
1969 births
Living people
Bharatiya Janata Party politicians from Maharashtra
Marathi politicians